Delilah's Power is a studio album by Ike & Tina Turner released in 1977. The album was released by United Artists Records a year after the Turners split up. The tracks are from some of their last recording sessions together. The only single "Delila's Power" (an "h" was later added on Delila) was released in Europe in 1975. The album was reissued by BGO Records on the compilation CD Delilah's Power/Airwaves in 2011.

Track list

Personnel 
 Album compiled by: Alan Warner
 Album Coordinator: John Ierardi
 Designed by: Kosh and Ria Lewerke
 Illustration (cover) by: Bob Hickson
 Liner photographs by: Norman Seeff

References 

1977 albums
Ike & Tina Turner albums
United Artists Records albums
Albums produced by Ike Turner